Protaphorura is a genus of arthropods belonging to the family Onychiuridae.

The species of this genus are found in Europe, Russia and Northern America.

Species:
 Protaphorura abscondita Absolon, 1901 
 Protaphorura aconae Arbea & Jordana, 1994

References

Collembola
Springtail genera